"Capitaine abandonné" is a 1985 song recorded by French band Gold. It was the lead single from the band's second studio album Capitaine abandonné on which it features in an extended version as first track. The song was also available in its main version on the next album Calicoba, released in late 1986. "Capitaine abandonné" was released as Gold's second single overall in January 1986, and achieved a huge success in France where it was a number-one hit.

Song information
"Capitaine abandonné" is a tribute to celebrities of sports, adventure and singing such as Arnaud de Rosnay or Philippe de Dieuleveult. The music video shows the group performing the song in a bar where men are playing cards. These images alternate with scenes of navigation during the refrains. "Capitaine abandonné" was recorded in a live version on the live album L'Olympia (1997), Le Palais des Sports (1999) and Live 2004 (2004) and was included on Gold's compilations La Compil' en Or (1990) and Les Plus Grands Succès (1995). In 2002, the song was covered by Axel Bauer, Patrick Fiori and Gérald De Palmas. This 3:09 version is the ninth track on Les Enfoirés' album Tous dans le même bateau.

Chart performances
In France, "Capitaine abandonné" entered the SNEP singles chart at number 35 on 8 February 1986, reaching the top ten in its sixth week. It topped the chart for four weeks, and totaled 13 weeks in the top ten and 24 weeks in the top 50.

Track listings
 7" single
 "Capitaine abandonné" — 3:54
 "Josy-Ann" — 3:34

 7" maxi
 "Capitaine abandonné" (extended version) — 6:26
 "Josy-Ann" — 3:34

 12" maxi - Remixes
 "Capitaine abandonné" (remix) — 6:37
 "Sail Away" (English version) — 3:54

Charts

Weekly charts

Year-end charts

Certifications and sales

References

1985 songs
1985 singles
Gold (band) songs
SNEP Top Singles number-one singles